Edward White (3 December 1899 – January 1984) was a British boxer. He competed in the men's middleweight event at the 1920 Summer Olympics. He fought under the name Ted White.

White won the 1922 Amateur Boxing Association British welterweight title, when boxing out of the Limehouse & Polar ABC.

References

External links
 

1899 births
1984 deaths
British male boxers
Olympic boxers of Great Britain
Boxers at the 1920 Summer Olympics
Middleweight boxers